Vedda may refer to:
the Vedda people
the Vedda language